Thomas Daniel Daly (December 12, 1891 – November 7, 1946) was a Canadian Major League Baseball player and coach. He was a catcher for the Chicago White Sox (1913–15), Cleveland Indians (1916) and Chicago Cubs (1918–21), helping the Cubs win the 1918 National League pennant.

Born in Saint John, New Brunswick, Daly played eight seasons in the major leagues, appearing in 244 games, and had 540 at-bats, 49 runs, 129 hits, 17 doubles, 3 triples, 55 RBI, 5 stolen bases, 25 walks, a .239 batting average, .274 on-base percentage, a .281 slugging percentage, 152 total bases and 8 sacrifice hits.

After his major league career, he managed the Toronto Maple Leafs of the International League for the early part of the 1932 season. He was a Boston Red Sox coach for 14 seasons (1933–46), the longest consecutive-year coaching tenure in Bosox history.

Daly died in Medford, Massachusetts at the age of 54 from colon cancer.

See also
 List of Major League Baseball players from Canada

External links

 Canadian Film Encyclopedia online publication, The Film Reference Library of the Toronto International Film]
 

1891 births
1946 deaths
Baseball people from New Brunswick
Boston Red Sox coaches
Buffalo Bisons (minor league) players
Canadian expatriate baseball players in the United States
Chicago White Sox players
Cleveland Indians players
Chicago Cubs players
Deaths from cancer in Massachusetts
Deaths from colorectal cancer
Jersey City Skeeters players
Los Angeles Angels (minor league) players
Lowell Grays players
Major League Baseball catchers
Major League Baseball players from Canada
Montreal Royals players
Portland Beavers players
Richmond Byrds players
Seattle Indians players
Sportspeople from Saint John, New Brunswick
Toronto Maple Leafs (International League) managers
Toronto Maple Leafs (International League) players
Wilkes-Barre Barons (baseball) players